Bandha (also karma-bandha) in Jainism, is the mutual intermingling of the soul and karmas (fine matter). Bandha (Bondage) comes immediately after the asrava (influx of karmas).

Overview 
According to the Jain text Tattvartha sutra, the activities that causes the bondage (or bandha) are:
Wrong belief
Non-abstinence
Negligence
Passions

According to the Jain text Samayasāra, a right believer is free from the karma-bandha i.e. bondage.

Champat Rai Jain, an influential Jain writer of the 20th century in his book The Key of Knowledge wrote:

Classification 
The bondage is of four kinds:
 according to the nature or species of karma
 depending upon the duration of karma
 Fruition of karma, and
 The quantity of space-points of karma

See also
Types of Karma

References

Sources 

 Alt URL

Jain philosophical concepts